Hermann Simon may refer to:

Hermann Simon (manager)
Hermann Simon (historian)
Hermann Simon (wrestler)
Hermann Theodor Simon, physicist